Galstyan is the surname of the following people
Aharon Galstyan (born 1970), Russian serial killer
Arsen Galstyan (born 1989), American judoka
Haykaz Galstyan (born 1977), Armenian Greco-Roman wrestler
Hovhannes Galstyan (born 1969), American film director
Katya Galstyan (born 1993), Armenian cross-country skier
Lilit Galstyan (born 1962), Armenian politician
Poghos Galstyan (born 1961), American footballer
Slavik Galstyan (born 1996), Armenian sport wrestler
Vaghinak Galstyan (born 1973), Armenian Greco-Roman wrestler
Vilen Galstyan (1941–2021), American ballet dancer
Vruir Galstyan (1924–1996), Armenian painter
Zorapet Ghukas Galstyan (1902–?), Armenian Soviet politician